The 1800 United States elections elected the members of the 7th United States Congress. The election took place during the First Party System, and is generally considered the first realigning election in American history. It was the first peaceful transfer of power between parties in American history. The Democratic-Republican Party won control of the Presidency and both houses of Congress for the first time. Conversely, the Federalist Party would never again control the Presidency or either house of Congress. Ohio was admitted as a state during the 7th Congress.

In the Presidential election, Democratic-Republican Vice President Thomas Jefferson became the first Democratic-Republican President, narrowly defeating incumbent Federalist President John Adams. Jefferson again won the South and Adams again won New England, but Jefferson won by adding New York and Maryland. Jefferson tied his own running mate, former Senator Aaron Burr of New York, in electoral votes, necessitating a contingent election in the House that Jefferson won. Burr, as the runner-up, was elected vice president. The contingent election led to the passage of the 12th Amendment, which altered the electoral college so that electors in all future elections cast an electoral vote for president and a separate electoral vote for vice president.

In the House, Democratic-Republicans won major gains, taking control of the chamber. In the Senate, Democratic-Republicans picked up several seats, taking control of the chamber for the first time in the party's history. This marked the first of three times in American history where one party flipped both chambers of Congress and the Presidency in a single election, along with 1840 and 1952.

See also
1800 United States presidential election
1800–01 United States House of Representatives elections
1800–01 United States Senate elections

References

 
1800